Jist or JIST may refer to:

 The Jist, a Norwegian experimental jazz duo
 Jorhat Institute of Science & Technology, Jorhat, Assam, India
 JIST Publishing (Job Information, Seeking and Training), an imprint of the New Mountain Learning publishing company
 JWST IV & V Simulation and Test (JIST), a software simulation for the Spacecraft bus (JWST)

See also
 Gist (disambiguation)